Geoffrey Goodwin (12 February 1923 – 20 September 1981) was an Australian cricketer. He played two first-class matches for Tasmania in 1951/52.

See also
 List of Tasmanian representative cricketers

References

External links
 

1923 births
1981 deaths
Australian cricketers
Tasmania cricketers
Cricketers from Hobart